The Minneapolis general strike of 1934 grew out of a strike by Teamsters against most of the trucking companies operating in Minneapolis, the major distribution center for the Upper Midwest. The strike began on May 16, 1934 in the Market District (the modern day Warehouse District).  The worst single day was 
Friday, July 20, called "Bloody Friday", when police shot at strikers in a downtown truck battle, killing two and injuring 67.  Ensuing violence lasted periodically throughout the summer.  The strike was formally ended on August 22.

With a coalition formed by local leaders associated with the Trotskyist Communist League of America, a group that later founded the Socialist Workers Party (United States), the strike paved the way for the organization of over-the-road drivers and the growth of the Teamsters labor union.  This strike, along with the 1934 West Coast Longshore Strike and the 1934 Toledo Auto-Lite Strike led by the American Workers Party, were also important catalysts for the rise of industrial unionism in the 1930s, much of which was organized through the Congress of Industrial Organizations.

Leadup to the strike

The International Brotherhood of Teamsters, under the leadership of Daniel Tobin in 1933, was a conservative union averse to strikes. While the union's members were often called on to support other unions' strikes, since their role in transport brought them in contact with workers in many other unionized industries, and had developed strong traditions of solidarity in some areas, the International Union itself was cautious to the point of having resistance to striking whatsoever. The provisions of the International Constitution that required a two thirds vote of the membership to authorize any strike action and that gave the International President the power to withhold strike benefits if he believed that a local union had struck prematurely, It also divided its members into separate unions along craft or industry lines: ice wagon drivers in one local, produce drivers in another, milk drivers in a third, and so forth.

The Teamsters also had a number of general locals; Local 574 in Minneapolis, which had no more than 75 members in 1934, was one of them. A number of members, including several Communist Party members who had gone to the newly formed Communist League of America (Left Opposition) in the internal split following Trotsky's expulsion, became members of Local 574 in the early 1930s.

These members – Ray Dunne, his brothers Miles and Grant, Carl Skoglund and later Farrell Dobbs – began by organizing coal drivers through a strike in the coldest part of 1933 that ignored both the cumbersome approval procedures established under the International's Constitution and the ineffective mediation procedures offered under the National Industrial Recovery Act. The victory gave the union a great deal of credibility among both drivers and their employers. The union began organizing drivers wherever they could be found.

The union also began preparing for the strike in a number of ways. It rented a large hall that could be used as a strike headquarters, kitchen and infirmary. It organized a women's auxiliary to staff the headquarters. Finally, it entered into discussions with the sympathetic leaders of organizations of farmers and the unemployed to obtain their support for the upcoming strike.

The strike

The strike began on May 16, 1934. The strike was remarkably effective, shutting down most commercial transport in the city with the exception of certain farmers, who were allowed to bring their produce into town, but delivering directly to grocers, rather than to the market area, which the union had shut down.

The market was to be the scene of the fiercest fighting during the earliest part of the strike. On Saturday, May 19, 1934, Minneapolis Police and private guards beat a number of strikers trying to prevent strikebreakers from unloading a truck in that area and waylaid several strikers who had responded to a report that scab drivers were unloading newsprint at the two major dailies' loading docks. When those injured strikers were brought back to the strike headquarters the police followed The strikers refused to let the police into the headquarters and left two unconscious on the sidewalk outside.

Fighting intensified the following Monday, May 21, when the police, augmented by several hundred newly deputized members of the Citizens Alliance, an employer organization, attempted to open up the market for trucking. Fighting began when a loaded truck began leaving a loading dock. The battle became a general melee when hundreds of pickets armed with clubs of all sorts rushed to the area to support the picketers; when the police drew their guns as if to shoot, the union sent a truck loaded with picketers into the mass of police and deputies in order to make it impossible for them to fire without shooting each other.

Other unions, particularly in the building trades, began to strike in sympathy with the Teamsters. The American Federation of Labor's Central Labor Council in Minneapolis offered financial and moral support for the strike, allowing the union to coordinate some of its picketing activities from its headquarters.

The fighting resumed on Tuesday, May 22. The picketers took the offensive and succeeded in driving both police and deputies from the market and the area around the union's headquarters.  Of the several hundred deputized "special police", two (C. Arthur Lyman and Peter Erath) were cornered and killed.  In the following "general riot" another roughly two dozen special police, municipal police, and strikers were beaten or wounded.

Negotiations
The Central Labor Council, the Building Trades Council and the Teamsters Joint Council approached Mike Johannes, the Minneapolis Chief of Police, to propose a truce, under which the local would cease picketing for twenty-four hours if the police and the employers ceased trying to move trucks. The employers, the Teamsters and the building trades signed a formal truce agreement. Johannes, however, declared that the police would move trucks once the truce expired, leading the union to announce that it was resuming picketing.

At this point city government appealed for Governor Floyd B. Olson to mobilize the National Guard, the 34th Infantry Division (United States) under Adjutant General Ellard A. Walsh. Olson did, but stopped short of actually deploying them, unwilling to alienate his labor supporters. Olson had already been attempting to mediate the dispute, On May 25, the employers and the union reached an agreement on a contract that provided union recognition, reinstatement for all strikers, seniority and a no-discrimination clause. The membership approved it overwhelmingly.

The strike resumes
The union thought that it had the employers' agreement to include the "inside workers", the warehouse employees as well as the drivers and loaders. When the employers reneged on that agreement the strike resumed on Tuesday, July 17. Governor Olson again mobilized, but did not deploy, the National Guard.

The union's leadership had chosen to use different tactics in this strike; it ordered its members to picket without carrying any clubs or weapons of any sort. The police, on the other hand, armed themselves with riot guns which sprayed buckshot over a wide arc.

On Friday, July 20, a single yellow truck drove to the central market escorted by fifty armed policemen. The truck made the small delivery successfully, but a vehicle carrying picketers wielding clubs cut off the truck. The police opened fire on the vehicle with shotguns, then turned their guns on the strikers filling the surrounding streets. An eyewitness reported that as the pickets moved to aid their fallen comrades, "They flowed directly into buckshot fire ... And the cops let them have it as they picked up their wounded. Lines of living, solid men fell, broke, wavering." He also said he saw one man "stepping on his own intestines, bright and bursting in the street, and another holding his severed arm in his right hand." By the end of hostilities, two strikers (Henry Ness and John Belor) were dead and sixty-seven wounded.

The police violence sparked a show of support from other unions and a one-day strike of transport workers. Each side stepped back from the confrontation: Chief Johannes and Mayor Bainbridge faced calls for their impeachment, while the union continued to urge its members not to give the police any justification for further attacks, disarming a number of picketers who wanted to return fire with fire. The union did not make any overt efforts to stop those few trucks accompanied by convoys of forty police cars apiece that tried to deliver goods, but sent so many cars with pickets to accompany those convoys that the police were never able to shepherd more than a few delivery trucks on any given day.

Martial law and settlement
A public commission, set up later by the governor, reported: 
On July 26, after these deaths of protesters at the hands of the police, Farmer-Labor governor Olson declared martial law and mobilized four thousand National Guardsmen of the 34th Infantry. Following this mobilization, there was no further loss of life.

Between July 26 and August 1, the National Guard began issuing operating permits to truck drivers, and engaging in roving patrols, curfews, and security details. On August 1, National Guard troops seized strike headquarters and placed arrested union leaders in a stockade at the state fairgrounds in Saint Paul. The next day, the headquarters were restored to the union and the leaders released from the stockade, as the National Guard carried out a token raid on the Citizens Alliance headquarters.

The union appealed to the Central Labor Union for a general strike and the governor issued an ultimatum that he would stop all trucks by midnight, August 5, if there was no settlement. Nevertheless, by August 14, there were thousands of trucks operating under military permits. Although the strike was gravely weakened by martial law and economic pressure, union leaders made it clear that it would continue.

On August 21, a federal mediator got acceptance of a settlement proposal from A. W. Strong, head of the Citizens Alliance, incorporating the union's major demands. The settlement was ratified, breaking the back of employer resistance to unionization in Minneapolis. In March 1935, International president Daniel Tobin expelled Local 574 from the International Brotherhood of Teamsters (IBT). However, in August 1936, Tobin was forced to relent and recharter the local as 544. The leaders of 544 went on to develop the conference bargaining that exists today in the IBT.

Local 544 remained under socialist leadership until 1941, when eighteen leaders of the union and the Socialist Workers Party were sentenced to federal prison. They were the first victims of the anti-radical Smith Act, a law the United States Supreme Court eventually found to be unconstitutional. The members sentenced to prison included James P.Cannon, Grace Carlson, Jake Cooper, Oscar Coover, Harry DeBoer, Farrell Dobbs, V.R. Dunne,
Max Geldman, Albert Goldman, Clarence Hamel, Emil Hansen, Carlos Hudson, Karl Kuehn, Felix Morrow, Edward Palmquist, Alfred Russel, Oscar Schoenfeld, Carl Skoglund.

Impact
The strike changed Minneapolis, which had been an open shop citadel under the control of the Citizens Alliance for years before 1934. In the aftermath of this strike thousands of other workers in other industries organized with the assistance of Local 574.

The strike also gave the Communist League, later renamed the Workers Party of America, a strong position in Local 574, and in other Teamster locals within the metropolitan area of Minneapolis. Trotskyist strength grew to over 100 members. This gave leadership to the Trotskyists through the various unions they led within the Central Labor Council. As mentioned below, through organizing the first area-wide contract for any union outside of rail, the Trotskyists established locals of their party wherever there were Teamster locals, from South Dakota to Iowa to Colorado. The party was later driven out of that local by prosecutions under the Smith Act and a trusteeship imposed by Tobin in the early 1940s.

More importantly, the strike launched the career of Farrell Dobbs, who played a significant role in the organization of over-the-road drivers throughout the Midwest. Those efforts led in turn to the transformation of the Teamsters from a craft union, made up of locals with a parochial focus on their own craft and locality, into a truly national union.

See also

 Union violence in the United States
 34th Infantry Division (United States)
 Bloody Friday (Minneapolis)
 Communist League of America
 Ellard A. Walsh
 Floyd B. Olson
 International Brotherhood of Teamsters
 History of Minneapolis
 Minneapolis Police Department
 Murder of workers in labor disputes in the United States

References

 Dobbs, Farrell. Teamster Rebellion. Paperback ed. New York: Pathfinder Press, 1998. 
 Dobbs, Farrell. Teamster Power. New York: Pathfinder Press, 1973. 
 Korth, Philip. Minneapolis Teamsters Strike of 1934. East Lansing, Mich.: Michigan State University Press, 1995. 
 Walker, Charles Rumford. American City: A Rank-and-File History. Paperback reissue. Minneapolis: University of Minnesota Press, 2005. (Originally published in 1937.) 
 Zieger, Robert H., and Gilbert J. Gall. American Workers, American Unions The Twentieth Century (The American Moment). New York: The Johns Hopkins UP, 2002. Print. Page 74. 
 Palmer, Bryan D., Revolutionary Teamsters: The Minneapolis Truckers' Strikes of 1934. Haymarket Books 2014.

External sources
 1934 Minneapolis Teamster Strikes Archive at marxists.org
 Trotskyist Work in the Trade Unions, by Chris Knox 
 75th anniversary of the Minneapolis truck drivers’ strike, by Ron Jorgenson

1934 labor disputes and strikes
1934 riots
1934 in Minnesota
History of Minneapolis
Minneapolis Police Department
Trotskyism in the United States
Labor-related riots in the United States
Police brutality in the United States
Riots and civil disorder in Minnesota
Labor disputes in Minnesota
Labor disputes led by the International Brotherhood of Teamsters
General strikes in the United States